David Z. Albert (born 1954) is Frederick E. Woodbridge Professor of Philosophy and Director of the MA Program in The Philosophical Foundations of Physics at Columbia University in New York.

Education and career

He received his bachelor's degree in physics from Columbia College (1976) and his PhD in theoretical physics from The Rockefeller University (1981) under Professor Nicola Khuri. Afterwards he worked with Yakir Aharonov of Tel Aviv University.  He has spent most of his career in the philosophy department at Columbia University, although he has also been a frequent visiting professor of philosophy at Rutgers University.   In 2015, he was elected a Fellow of the American Academy of Arts & Sciences.

Philosophical work

Albert has published three books, Quantum Mechanics and Experience (1992), Time and Chance (2000) and After Physics (2015), as well as numerous articles on quantum mechanics. His books have been both praised and criticized for their informal, conversational style.

Public philosophy

Appearance in What the Bleep Do We Know!?
Albert appeared in the controversial movie What the Bleep Do We Know!? (2004). According to an article published in Popular Science, he was "outraged at the final product."  The article states that Albert granted the filmmakers a near-four hour interview about quantum mechanics being unrelated to consciousness or spirituality. His interview was then edited and incorporated into the film in a way that misrepresented his views. In the article, Albert also expresses his feelings of gullibility after having been "taken" by the filmmakers. Although Albert is listed as a scientist taking part in the sequel to What the Bleep, called "Down the Rabbit Hole", this sequel is a "director's cut", composed of extra footage from the filming of the first movie. The "Down the Rabbit Hole" version features Albert as the first subject in the interview portion of the film. In that interview he expresses his disagreement with the major thrust of the original "What the Bleep Do We Know!?"

Feud with Lawrence Krauss
In March 2012, Albert published an extremely negative review of Lawrence Krauss' book A Universe from Nothing: Why There Is Something Rather Than Nothing in The New York Times book review. Krauss claimed that his book counters religion and philosophy, and the book was cited by Richard Dawkins as comparable to Darwin’s Origin of Species, on the grounds that it upends the “last trump card of the theologian.” In his review, Albert lamented the way in which books like Krauss' forward critiques of religion that are "pale, small, silly, nerdy”, and expresses how "the whole business of approaching the struggle with religion as if it were a card game, or a horse race, or some kind of battle of wits, just feels all wrong".  Disagreeing with the central thesis of Krauss' book, Albert wrote:

Krauss reacted vehemently and responded in an interview published in The Atlantic, calling  Albert “moronic” and dismissing the philosophy of science as worthless. In March 2013, The New York Times reported that Albert, who had previously been invited to speak at the Isaac Asimov Memorial Debate at the American Museum of Natural History, at which Krauss was also an invited speaker, was later disinvited. Albert claimed "It sparked a suspicion that Krauss must have demanded that I not be invited. But of course I’ve got no proof."

References

External links

 David Albert faculty page
 David Albert Interview at BigThink.com. Discussing the measurement problem in quantum mechanics theory (53 minutes).
 Video discussions with Sean Carroll about science related topics on Bloggingheads.tv

Columbia University faculty
Rockefeller University alumni
Living people
1954 births
21st-century American philosophers
Philosophers of physics
Philosophers from New York (state)
Columbia College (New York) alumni